Hierochloe is a genus of plants in the grass family known generally as sweetgrass. These are perennial rhizomatous grasses found primarily in temperate and subarctic regions of Eurasia and North America, although some species extend southwards into Australia and Latin America.

These erect green grasses are known for their sweet scent. They bear panicle inflorescences with rounded grass grain fruits.

Some authors advocate merging the two genera Hierochloe and Anthoxanthum, though others disagree.

 Species

 formerly included
numerous species now regarded as better suited to other genera: Anthoxanthum Centotheca Holcus

References

Pooideae
Poaceae genera